Regal Entertainment, Inc. (formerly and more commonly known as Regal Films) is a Philippine film production company based in Pasig. It was founded by Lily Monteverde on August 19, 1962. It has produced movies of all genres; and is the oldest surviving movie studio in the Philippines.

History
In the beginning, Mother Lily Monteverde and her father Remy put up a popcorn stand at the Podmon Theater (now LRT-2 Recto Station) in C.M. Recto, Manila (which served as the head office of Regal before it moved to the Valencia studio and eventually to the Tycoon Center in Ortigas Center, Pasig). Regal Films started as a distributor of foreign films, such as That Man from Istanbul, Marsha and All Mine to Give, pouring funds for Mother Lily to produce a local movie. In 1976, Mother Lily asked permission from her father to produce her first project, Kayod sa Umaga, Kayod sa Gabi and it became a big hit then in theatres. Alma Moreno was the first star who had an exclusive contract with Regal, becoming the first of the Regal Babies.

In the early years, Regal Films mostly produced local movies with a "mature" and "daring" style, although it produced more "wholesome" pictures later on. In 1987, it ventured into local television; "Regal Television" produced several entertainment programs in the '80s and '90s and aired on three different channels, ABS-CBN 2, GMA 7 and IBC 13.

Some of the studio's most memorable films are:
Scorpio Nights - a controversial 1985 erotic thriller film directed by Peque Gallaga
Shake, Rattle and Roll - The first instalment was produced and released in 1984 by Athena Productions while the subsequent films were later produced and released by Regal Films itself.
Relasyon - one of the most remarkable films of the Vilma Santos-Christopher de Leon tandem.
Tiyanak
Yamashita: The Tiger's Treasure
Mano Po - a franchise that involves the lives of the Chinese Filipino families. Carmina Villarroel, Kris Aquino, Angel Locsin and Maricel Soriano were among the actresses who starred in the films, and the sixth instalment was Sharon Cuneta's first major role in a Regal movie.
Live Show (aka Toro) - a film released in early 2001 which was met with controversy for its provocative scenes.
Petrang Kabayo at ang Pilyang Kuting

Television
In the late 1980s Regal Television was a weekly Sunday programming block featuring the country's biggest artists from Regal Films (e.g. Gabby Concepcion, Snooky Serna, Manilyn Reynes, Sheryl Cruz, etc). In 1987, Regal co-produced "Mother Studio Presents" with GMA Network and featured monthly guest artists; and "Regal Drama Presents" with ABS-CBN and featured Maricel Soriano. In 1989, ABS-CBN took over the majority of her production on the latter program and renamed it The Maricel Drama Special. The movie studio had short-lived specials as well as mini-drama series celebrating the country's other elite artists or upcoming movie stars.

Regal Television has produced the 2011 reboot of Regal Shocker for TV5 and 10 years later, Gen Z (a co-production with Cignal Entertainment (formerly Studio5). At present, they serve as an entertainment blocktimer for GMA Network, co-producing Regal Studio Presents (a Sunday made-for-TV movie anthology) and Mano Po Legacy (a non-Sine Novela based on the Mano Po franchise). They also produce ABS-CBN series FPJ's Batang Quiapo.

Filmography

References

 
Film production companies of the Philippines
Companies based in Pasig
Entertainment companies established in 1962
Philippine companies established in 1962
Privately held companies of the Philippines